Parliamentary elections were held in Somalia on 31 December 1984. The country was a one-party state at the time, with the Somali Revolutionary Socialist Party (SRSP) as the sole legal party. Voters were asked to approve a list of 171 SRSP candidates. Turnout was reported to be 99.86% by the communist government.

Results

References

1984 elections in Africa
1984 in Somalia
Elections in Somalia
One-party elections
Single-candidate elections
December 1984 events in Africa